is a railway station in Miyakonojō, Miyazaki, Japan. It is operated by  JR Kyushu and is on the Nippō Main Line.

Lines

Layout 
The station, which is unstaffed, consists of an island platform serving two tracks with two sidings. The station building is a modern steel frame function structure which houses a waiting area and an automatic ticket vending machine. Access to the island platform is by means of a footbridge.

Adjacent stations

History
The track was extended east in phases, with Aoidake opening as the new terminus on 21 March 1916. On 15 December 1923, the entire stretch of track from Shigeoka through Miyazaki to Yoshimatsu, including Aoidake, was designated as part of the Nippō Main Line. With the privatization of Japanese National Railways (JNR), the successor of JGR, on 1 April 1987, the Aoidake came under the control of JR Kyushu.

Passenger statistics
In fiscal 2016, the station was used by an average of 14 passengers (boarding only) per day.

See also
List of railway stations in Japan

References

External links
Aoidake (JR Kyushu)

Railway stations in Miyazaki Prefecture
Railway stations in Japan opened in 1916